Łomżyński Klub Sportowy 1926 Łomża is a football club based in Łomża, Poland.

Stadium

See also 

 Football in Poland
 List of football teams

References

External links 
  
 ŁKS Łomża at the 90minut.pl website  

Sport in Podlaskie Voivodeship
 
1926 establishments in Poland